Wang Ryung (died May 897), more commonly known by his Temple name of Sejo or Posthumous name of King Wimu the Great. He was a general and politician during the Later Goguryeo periods who would become the father of Wang Geon, founder of the Goryeo dynasty.

After died at Geumseong County (금성군) in 897, he was buried in a cave along the river in Yeonganseong, which later named and known as Changneung tomb (창릉, 昌陵). On 11 March 1217, it was moved to Bongeun Temple (봉은사) and in 1243, it was moved again to Gaegol-dong in Ganghwa. In 1027 (18th years reign of Hyeonjong of Goryeo), he was given a Posthumous name of Won-ryeol(yeol) (원렬(열), 元烈) and in 1235 (40th years reign of Gojong of Goryeo), he was given again the name of Min-hye (민혜, 敏惠).

Family
Father: Uijo of Goryeo (고려 의조)
Grandfather: Gukjo of Goryeo (고려 국조)
Grandmother: Queen Jeonghwa (정화왕후)
Mother: Queen Wonchang (원창왕후)
Wife: Queen Wisuk, of the Han clan (위숙왕후 한씨)
Son: Wang Geon (왕건; 877–943)

In popular culture
Portrait by Shin Goo in the 2000–2002 KBS1 TV series Taejo Wang Geon.

See also 
 Founding legends of the Goryeo royal family
 Rulers of Goryeo

References

Goryeo people
897 deaths
Korean generals
Year of birth unknown
9th-century Korean people